Epifanio Mejía Quijano (1838–1913) was a Colombian poet and politician who in his lifetime published over 134 poems. He was born in Yarumal, Antioquia, in 1838, in an hacienda known as El Caunce, and died in an asylum in Medellín in 1913. He is known as one of the most famous poets from Antioquia, and one of his poems was chosen as the official Anthem of Antioquia.

Biography
He was the son of Ramon Mejia Vallejo and Maria Luisa Quijano. After the death of this father, he moved to Medellin in search of better economic opportunities. He soon started to write poetry.

Alongside the poet Gregorio Gutiérrez González and others of his stature, Epifanio Mejía was one of the major poets from Antioquia during the 19th century.

One of his poems, "The song of Antioquia," was chosen as the official anthem of Antioquia.

Between 1868 and 1869, he collaborated on the literary magazine El Oasis (The Oasis), directed by Isidoro Isaza. He was considered insane and admitted to the mental hospital in Medillín at the age of 31.

He died in 1913.

See also
Basilica of Our Lady of Mercy, Yarumal

References

1838 births
1913 deaths
poets